St Margaret's and Westgate Division, Suffolk is an electoral division of Suffolk which returns two county councillors to Suffolk County Council. It is covers parts of the Central Area of Ipswich and consists of St Margaret's  Ward and Westgate Ward of Ipswich Borough Council as well as small part of Castle Hill Ward in the North West Area, Ipswich.

References

Electoral Divisions of Suffolk